Nuclino is a cloud-based team collaboration software which allows teams to collaborate and share information in real time. It was founded in Munich, Germany in 2015. Some notable features include a WYSIWYG collaborative real-time editor and a visual representation of a team's knowledge in a graph. In addition to its web-based and desktop application, in 2018, Nuclino launched a free mobile app for Android and iOS.

See also
 List of collaborative software
 List of wiki software
 Comparison of wiki software
 Comparison of wiki hosting services

References

External links 
 

German companies established in 2016
Collaborative software
Proprietary wiki software
Technical communication tools
Companies based in Munich
Knowledge markets
Wiki farms
Software companies established in 2016